Bernard Sunley (4 November 1910 – 20 November 1964) was a British property developer, and the founder of Bernard Sunley & Sons.

Born at Catford in south-east London, he was the son of John Sunley, a florist and fruiterer, and was educated at St Ann's School in Hanwell. After leaving school at the age of fourteen, he hired a horse and cart to move earth, and then went into the landscape gardening business. One of his first major contracts was re-laying the pitch at Highbury for Arsenal FC.

In November 1931, at Holy Trinity Church, Southall, Sunley married Mary Goddard, a daughter of William Goddard, a farmer, of Waxlow Farm, Southall. They had two daughters and a son. 

From earth-moving, Sunley moved into the open-cast mining business. In 1940, he founded Bernard Sunley & Sons. During the Second World War he built over 100 airfields, and in 1942 he purchased the business of Blackwood Hodge, then a supplier of agricultural machinery and later a successful plant hire and sale business. He subsequently "ranked alongside the most successful property developers of the 1950s property boom".

Sunley campaigned as a Conservative Party candidate for Ealing West in 1945, but was unsuccessful.

Sunley established the Bernard Sunley Charitable Foundation in 1960 with a pledge of £300,000-worth of shares. As of 2011, it had made grants of more than £92 million.

He died in 1964. His son, John Sunley (died 2011) was a property developer and philanthropist. His grandson is Richard Tice, a businessman and leader of Reform UK.

Bernard Sunley Hall, named after him, is a hall of residence for Imperial College London students at 40–44 Evelyn Gardens Square.

See also
City Tower, Manchester (formerly Sunley House)

References

1910 births
1964 deaths
British company founders
People from Catford
Sunley family
20th-century British businesspeople